Wing On House is a commercial building located at No. 71 Des Voeux Road Central, Central, Hong Kong.

History
Upon its completion in 1967, it was Hong Kong's tallest commercial building, with 31 storeys. It held that distinction until 1971, when it was surpassed by Pearl City Mansion.

Name
It is named after Wing On, a department stores and insurance conglomerate with a history dating back more than 100 years. Two other buildings along Des Voeux Road Central are also named after Wing On: Wing On Centre in Sheung Wan and Wing On Life Building in Central.

Features
Each floor occupies around 11,000 square feet (1,000 m²).

The building currently houses the Hong Kong Branch of Public Bank Berhad, the Hong Kong Law Society, BOC Group Life Insurance and the local Consulate of Ghana as well as offices of Hang Seng Bank, whose old and new headquarters are next to Wing On House.

See also 
 List of buildings and structures in Hong Kong

References

External links
 

Central, Hong Kong
Office buildings completed in 1967
Skyscraper office buildings in Hong Kong
Wheelock and Company